Stanley A. Johnson (January 13, 1925 – June 15, 2013) was an American politician, farmer, and Methodist minister.

Born near Mitchell, South Dakota, he served in the United States Army during World War II. He then farmed and was a Methodist minister. Johnson served in the South Dakota House of Representatives 1967-1976 as a Republican. He died in Tyndall, South Dakota.

Notes

1925 births
2013 deaths
People from Davison County, South Dakota
Republican Party members of the South Dakota House of Representatives
American Methodist clergy
United States Army personnel of World War II
Military personnel from South Dakota